Prairie Creek Peak, at  above sea level is the sixth highest peak in the Smoky Mountains of Idaho. The peak is located on the border of both Sawtooth National Forest and Sawtooth National Recreation Area and Blaine and Camas counties. No roads or trails go to the summit.

References 

Mountains of Idaho
Mountains of Blaine County, Idaho
Mountains of Camas County, Idaho
Sawtooth National Forest